Emma Jeffcoat is an Australian triathlete.

Career
Emma Jeffcoat competed in the German  for the  club.

In March 2016 she became a champion of the U23-Oceania triathlon and second-class Oceania champion in the elite class. She won ITU Triathlon World Cup events in Mooloolaba and Chengdu in 2018 and Tiszaujvaros in 2019, and was part of a relay team that won in Abu Dhabi in 2019. She placed 26th in the women's triathlon and 9th in the relay at the 2021 Olympics.

In 2020 she was hit by a car and broke her collarbone. She worked as a nurse during the some of the COVID-19 pandemic. She then competed in the Women's and mixed relay triathlon events at the 2020 Tokyo Olympics in 2021.

References

1994 births
Australian female triathletes
Living people
Triathletes at the 2020 Summer Olympics
Olympic triathletes of Australia
20th-century Australian women
21st-century Australian women